The following is a list of episodes from the Disney XD Original Series, Kick Buttowski: Suburban Daredevil. The series premiered on February 13, 2010. As of November 6, 2010, the first season was completed. Each episode is 11 minutes and 2 episodes show in one premiere. A premiere is 22 mins.

On June 7, 2010, the series was renewed for a second and final season, which started airing on April 30, 2011.  Halfway through the second season, an additional six episodes were ordered.

The show aired its final episodes on December 2, 2012.

Series overview

Episodes

Season 1 (2010)

Season 2 (2011–12) 
Season 2 premiered on April 30, 2011 and ended on December 2, 2012.
Last Fan Standing is the series finale of this series.

References

Lists of American children's animated television series episodes
Lists of Disney Channel television series episodes